Bernard Lefèvre (22 June 1930 – 16 December 2019) was a French footballer. A left wing, his career lasted from 1949 to 1964, over which time he played in more than 400 matches and scored 143 goals.  He played for Lille OSC, AS Saint-Étienne, FC Nancy and Olympique de Marseille.

He played on two Ligue 1 champions, in 1954 with Lille and 1957 with Saint-Étienne. In 1953, he lifted the Coupe de France with Lille.

He was member of the French squad in the men's tournament at the 1952 Summer Olympics.

Lefèvre died in Reims at the age of 89 on 16 December 2019.

References

External links
 

1930 births
2019 deaths
French footballers
Lille OSC players
FC Nancy players
Olympic footballers of France
Olympique de Marseille players
AS Saint-Étienne players
Footballers at the 1952 Summer Olympics
Sportspeople from Aisne
Association football forwards
Association football midfielders
Footballers from Hauts-de-France